Raša is a small settlement in the Municipality of Sežana in the Littoral region of Slovenia. It no longer has any permanent residents.

References

External links
Raša on Geopedia

Populated places in the Municipality of Sežana